Warblade is a computer game.

Warblade may also refer to:
 Warblade (comics), a Wildstorm character
 Warblade (Dungeons & Dragons), a character class in the roleplaying game